Vicky A. Clark (born December 19, 1950) is an American independent curator of contemporary art, art historian, and writer based in Pittsburgh, Pennsylvania.

Early life and education 

Born in Atlanta, Georgia, Clark moved to Santa Monica, California, at the age of 10. She attended Santa Monica High School, before attending UCLA and majoring in Art History. Graduating in 1972, she then attended UC Davis for her master's degree in Art History, and went on to receive her Ph.D. in Art History from the University of Michigan.

Publications 
Clark's writings include a book on Robert Qualters, Pennsylvania Artist of the Year in 2014, entitled Robert Qualters: Autobiographical Mythologies (University of Pittsburgh Press).

Exhibitions 
 Recycling Art History at the Pittsburgh Center for the Arts, 1998
 Comic Release: Negotiating Identity for a New Generation (co-curated with Barbara Bloemink), Armory Center for the Arts, Pasadena, 2004
 Invisible Threads at Clarion University, 2009
 The White Show: Subtlety in the Age of Spectacle at Clarion University, 2011
 Coming Attractions, Lawrenceville, 2014

References

External links
 Vicky A Clark website.

1950 births
Living people
Artists from Pittsburgh
American art curators
American women artists
American art historians
Gender studies academics
University of California, Davis alumni
University of Michigan College of Literature, Science, and the Arts alumni
Writers from Pittsburgh
Historians from Pennsylvania
Women art historians
American women historians
20th-century American historians
21st-century American historians
American women curators